The European Parliament's presence in Kirchberg, Luxembourg currently consists of the Parliament's secretariat, although the Parliament had held plenary sessions in the city for a brief period.

History

The provisional arrangement was reiterated on 8 April 1965 with the Decision on the provisional location of certain institutions and departments of the Communities. This was following the Merger Treaty, which combined the executives of the three Communities into a single institutional structure. However, with the merged executives, the Commission and most departments were grouped together in Brussels, rather than Luxembourg City. To compensate Luxembourg for the loss, the agreement granted a city the right to host a number of bodies, including the Secretariat of the Assembly (now of the Parliament).

Despite the 1965 agreement, however, the Parliament's seat was a source of contention. Wishing to be closer to the activities in Brussels and Luxembourg City, a few plenary sessions were held by the Parliament between 1967 and 1981 in Luxembourg instead of Strasbourg – against the wishes of France and in 1981 it returned to holding sessions entirely in Strasbourg.

Buildings

There are a handful of buildings in Luxembourg used by the Parliament. The city hosts the Secretariat of the European Parliament (employing over 4000 people), mostly based in the Kirchberg district.

The buildings in use are the ones named after Robert Schuman and Konrad Adenauer and most recently two new tower buildings (TOA and TOB) either side of Av. John F. Kennedy.

Some services are installed in the Gold Bell building in the south of the city. The old hemicycle in Luxembourg City still exists despite no longer being used by the Parliament since 1981 (it is now the seat of the EFTA Court).

See also
 European parliament
 Seat of the European Parliament in Strasbourg
 Espace Léopold
 Alcide de Gasperi Building
 Institutional seats of the European Union

References

External links
 Visiting Parliament EuroParl website
 Naming of the buildings EuroParl website
 Seat of the EP CVCE website

European Parliament
Government buildings in Luxembourg
Buildings and structures of the European Union
Architecture in Luxembourg